The following lists events that happened during 1950 in Australia.

Incumbents

 Monarch – George VI
 Governor-General – William McKell
 Prime Minister – Robert Menzies
 Chief Justice – Sir John Latham

State Premiers 
 Premier of New South Wales – James McGirr
 Premier of Queensland – Ned Hanlon
 Premier of South Australia – Thomas Playford IV
 Premier of Tasmania – Robert Cosgrove
 Premier of Victoria – Thomas Hollway (until 27 June), then John McDonald
 Premier of Western Australia – Ross McLarty

State Governors
 Governor of New South Wales – Sir John Northcott
 Governor of Queensland – Sir John Lavarack
 Governor of South Australia – Sir Charles Norrie
 Governor of Tasmania – Sir Hugh Binney
 Governor of Victoria – Sir Dallas Brooks
 Governor of Western Australia – Sir James Mitchell

Events 
 25 January – The Tank Landing Ship HMAS Tarakan explodes at Garden Island in Sydney, killing 8 people.
 8 February – Petrol rationing ends, nearly ten years after it was introduced during World War II.
 6 May – A state election is held in Tasmania. The result is a hung parliament, but Robert Cosgrove's Labor Party remains in power with independent support.
 13 May – A state election is held in Victoria.
 23 June – The Parliament of Australia passes the Communist Party Dissolution Bill, effectively banning the operation of the Communist Party of Australia.
 26 June – Douglas DC-4 Amana crashes near Perth, Western Australia, killing 28. One passenger survived the crash.
 26 July – The government announces that Australia will send troops to fight in the Korean War. The first Australian forces land in Korea on 17 September.
 28 October – The Smith's Weekly newspaper, founded in 1919, is published for the last time.
 New South Wales and Queensland receive extraordinary annual rainfall.

Arts and literature

11 December – A Town Like Alice by Nevil Shute is published.

Unknown dates
 William Dargie wins the Archibald Prize with his portrait of Sir Leslie McConnan
 The novel Power Without Glory by Frank Hardy is published.
 The Ballet Corroboree, by John Antill, is first performed

Sport
 General
 Australia wins 34 gold medals at the 4th British Empire Games, held in Auckland, New Zealand

 Cricket
 New South Wales wins the Sheffield Shield
 Cycling
 Sid Patterson wins the world amateur pursuit cycling title in Belgium
 Football
 Brisbane Rugby League premiership: Easts defeated Wests 14-10
 New South Wales Rugby League premiership: South Sydney defeated Western Suburbs 21-15
 South Australian National Football League premiership: won by Norwood
 Victorian Football League premiership: Essendon defeated North Melbourne 92-54
 Golf
 Australian Open: won by Norman Von Nida
 Australian PGA Championship: won by Norman Von Nida
 Horse Racing
 Grey Boots wins the Caulfield Cup
 Alister wins the Cox Plate
 Comic Court wins the Melbourne Cup
 Motor Racing
 The Australian Grand Prix was held at Nuriootpa and won by Doug Whiteford driving a Ford
 Tennis
 Australian Open men's singles: Frank Sedgman defeats Ken McGregor 6-3 6-4 4-6 6-1
 Australian Open women's singles: Louise Brough defeats Doris Hart 6-4 3-6 6-4
 Davis Cup: Australia defeats the United States 4–1 in the 1950 Davis Cup final
 US Open: John Bromwich and Frank Sedgman win the Men's Doubles
 Wimbledon: John Bromwich and Adrian Quist win the Men's Doubles
 Yachting
 Margaret Rintoul takes line honours and Nerida wins on handicap in the Sydney to Hobart Yacht Race

Births
 1 January – Wayne Bennett, rugby league footballer and coach
 26 January – Barry Round, Australian rules footballer (died 2022)
 30 January –  Jack Newton, golfer (died 2022)
 11 February – John Cobb, politician
 14 February – Phil Dent, tennis player
 16 February – Malcolm Blight, Australian Rules football player
 20 February – Garry Manuel, football (soccer) player
 1 March – Estelle Blackburn, journalist
 11 March – Sam Kekovich, Australian Rules football player
 18 March – Larry Perkins, ATCC/V8 Supercars racing driver
 20 March – Warren Snowdon, politician
 10 April – Mick Dodson, indigenous leader
 11 April – Jim Molan, politician and army officer (died 2023)
 13 April – Tommy Raudonikis, rugby league player and coach (died 2021)
 15 April – Peter Cochrane, historian
 21 April – Bruce Duperouzel, footballer and cricketer
 29 April – Phillip Noyce, film director
 11 May – Gary Foley, indigenous activist
 15 May – Jim Bacon, Premier of Tasmania (2001–2004, died 2004)
 26 May – Paul Omodei, WA politician
 29 May – Lesley Hunt, tennis player
 31 May – Warren Entsch, politician
 13 June – Belinda Bauer, actress
 13 July – Kevin McQuay, businessman (died 2005)
 15 July 
 Colin Barnett, WA politician
 Alan Hurst, cricketer
 Peter Reith, politician (died 2022)
 17 July – Nick Bolkus, politician
 21 July – Allan Maher, football (soccer) goalkeeper
 8 August – Philip Salom, poet and novelist
 16 August – Jeff Thomson, cricketer
 19 August – Graeme Beard, cricketer
 6 September – Robyn Davidson, writer
 11 September – Bruce Doull, Australian Rules football player
 27 September – John Marsden, writer
 14 October – Kate Grenville, novelist
 30 October – Tim Sheens, rugby league footballer and coach
 2 November – Graeme Murphy, choreographer
 7 November – John Lang, rugby league footballer and coach
 25 November – Alexis Wright, writer
 1 December – Ross Hannaford, guitarist (Daddy Cool) (died 2016)
 10 December – Robert Cusack, swimmer
 12 December
Louis Nowra, writer and playwright
Judy Wajcman, sociologist
 18 December – Gillian Armstrong, film director
 22 December – Nick Enright, playwright, director (died 2003)

Deaths

 2 January
 James Dooley, 21st Premier of New South Wales (born in Ireland) (b. 1877)
 Beaumont Smith, film director and producer (b. 1885)
 20 January – Ray Duggan, speedway racer (b. 1913)
 25 January – Chummy Fleming, trade unionist (born in the United Kingdom) (b. 1863)
 9 February – Ted Theodore, 20th Premier of Queensland (b. 1884)
 23 February – Henry Willis, New South Wales politician (b. 1860)
 19 March – Harry Wright, Australian rules footballer (Essendon) (b. 1870)
 14 April – Sir Albert Dunstan, 33rd Premier of Victoria (b. 1882)
 6 May – Lancelot De Mole, engineer and inventor (b. 1880)
 15 May – Jack Hickey, Olympic rugby union and league player (b. 1887)
 11 June – Ernest Henshaw, Western Australian politician (b. 1870)
 20 June – Claude Jennings, cricketer (b. 1884)
 14 July – Bill Howell, cricketer (b. 1869)
 31 July – George Wise, Victorian politician and solicitor (b. 1853)
 6 August – Edwin Corboy, Western Australian politician (b. 1896)
 8 August – Sir Fergus McMaster, businessman and aviation pioneer (b. 1879)
 3 September – Michael Durack, Western Australian politician and pastoralist (b. 1865)
 22 September – Edward Fowell Martin, public servant and soldier (b. 1875)
 24 September – Dame Mary Cook, 6th Spouse of the Prime Minister of Australia (born in the United Kingdom) (b. 1863)
 6 November – Frank Brennan, Victorian politician (b. 1873)
 20 November – Erle Cox, journalist and science fiction author (b. 1873)
 2 December – James Fenton, Victorian politician (b. 1864)
 29 December – Albert Lane, New South Wales politician (b. 1873)

See also
 List of Australian films of the 1950s

External links
 1950s Australia 

 
Australia
Years of the 20th century in Australia